Collalto may refer to:
Collalto, Susegana in the province of Treviso
 House of Collalto, named after it
 Collalto, Penne - a frazione of Penne in the province of Pescara 
 Collalto, Colle di Val d'Elsa - a frazione of Colle di Val d'Elsa in the province of Siena
 Collalto - a frazione of Tarcento in the province of Udine
 Collalto, Montebello Vicentino in the province of Vicenza 
 Monte Collalto - a mountain in the Alpi Pusteresi
 Collalto Sabino - a town in the province of Rieti
 Palazzo Zane Collalto - a palazzo in Venice
 Antonio Collalto (dramatist) - Italian actor and dramatist
 Antonio Collalto (mathematician), Italian mathematician